Cardinia Dam Power Station is a small hydroelectric power station at Cardinia Reservoir near Melbourne, Australia. It is located at the outlet of the  pipeline transferring water from Silvan Reservoir.  It is capable of producing  of electricity and is owned by Pacific Energy.

References

Hydroelectric power stations in Victoria (Australia)
Buildings and structures in the Shire of Cardinia